Pratik Desai (born 25 December 1989) is an Indian cricketer. He is a right-handed batsman and leg-break bowler who plays Mizoram. He had previously played for Maharashtra & Services. He was born in Pune.

Desai made his cricketing debut for Maharashtra Under-17s in the 2006-07 Vijay Merchant Trophy in December 2006. He made his only first-class appearance in the same month, against Bengal. He scored a golden duck in the first innings in which he batted, and 4 runs in the second.

Desai made two Twenty20 appearances in April 2007, as Maharashtra finished bottom of their group.

References

External links
Pratik Desai at CricketArchive 

1989 births
Living people
Indian cricketers
Maharashtra cricketers
Services cricketers
Cricketers from Pune